Sinsheim (Elsenz) Hauptbahnhof — called Sinsheim (Elsenz) station until 2010 — is a station on the Neckargemünd–Bad Friedrichshall-Jagstfeld railway in the German state of Baden-Württemberg. The station falls within the area of the Verkehrsverbund Rhein-Neckar (Transport association of Rhine-Neckar) and is an important station in the Kraichgau. In the area of the city of Sinsheim, there are also stations (all called Haltepunkte in German, "halts") at Hoffenheim, Sinsheim Museum/Arena, Steinsfurt and Reihen.

History 
The station was opened in 1868 to coincide with the opening of the Meckenheim–Rappenau section of the Neckargemünd–Bad Friedrichshall-Jagstfeld railway of the Grand Duchy of Baden State Railways. The station building was built in 1867/68. It was designed in the Weinbrenner style by a student of the architect Friedrich Weinbrenner. The building, including its ground and upper storey, is listed as a cultural monument by the state of Baden-Württemberg.

The station facilities had been expanded by 1900 with an overpass over Dührener Straße (street).

In 2009, the town of Sinsheim began to renovate the entrance building and the surrounding area, including the establishment  of a park and ride parking area and the redesign of the bus station. The existing pedestrian zone of the town was extended to the station. Since December 2009, trains on the Rhine-Neckar S-Bahn have stopped at Sinsheim Hauptbahnhof.

The northern line of the Heilbronn Stadtbahn was opened at the 2014/2015 timetable change. Following the construction of the section of line from Bad Rappenau to Bad Friedrichshall between 7 January 2014 and 30 April 2015, the new S42 service was opened between Sinsheim and Bad Rappenau. In the spring of 2015, S42 services were extended from Bad Rappenau to central Heilbronn.

Station infrastructure

The station building has a largely symmetrical floor plan centred on an axis extending from the southern end of Bahnhofstraße. The platforms are on the south side of the building. East of the station building is the bus station. The tracks and the street of Jahnstraße to its south are spanned by a footbridge. This was rebuilt during the line's electrification. The station has three platform tracks. Track 1 is located next to the station building and tracks 2 and 3 are on a central platform. South of the tracks is a timber roundhouse, including a turntable. The roundhouse, which, with its stalls for two locomotives, is used by Eisenbahnfreunde Kraichgau (railway friends of the Kraichgau) as its club house, stood in Meckenheim until 1947.

Rail services
In 2015, Sinsheim Hauptbahnhof is served by Regional-Express service RE2 (Mannheim–Heilbronn) every two hours. On weekends, occasional services of Regionalbahn service RB 10 run on the Mannheim–Stuttgart route. Every half-hour there is a service of line S5 of the Rhine-Neckar S-Bahn (Heidelberg–Eppingen). There are hourly services of S42 of the Heilbronn Stadtbahn between Sinsheim and Heilbronn Hauptbahnhof/Willy-Brandt-Platz.

All services except S42 are usually operated with class 425 electric multiple units. Individual services of the Mannheim–Heilbronn route are operated as push-pull trains propelled by class 111 locomotives and five Silberling carriages. Line S42 is operated with two-car Flexity Swift sets.

The main station is next to a bus station, which is served by bus lines 741, 761, 763, 765, 767, 768, 771, 772, 795, 796 and 797 of the PalatinaBus company, which connect to the town of Sinsheim. Shuttle buses to the Rhein-Neckar Arena football stadium, where TSG 1899 Hoffenheim plays its home games, also operate from the bus station.

Notes

Railway stations in Baden-Württemberg
Rhine-Neckar S-Bahn stations
Railway stations in Germany opened in 1868
Buildings and structures in Rhein-Neckar-Kreis